Immunology Letters is a peer-reviewed academic journal of immunology. The journal was established in 1979 and is published by Elsevier on behalf of the European Federation of Immunological Societies on a monthly basis. The current editor is Vaclav Horejsi.

Indexing and abstracting
The journal is indexed and abstracted in the following bibliographic databases:

References

External links

Immunology journals
Elsevier academic journals
English-language journals
Monthly journals
Publications established in 1979